The Hindu is an English-language, Indian newspaper.

The Hindu(s) may also refer to :
 The Hindu (Tamil), newspaper in the Tamil language
 The Hindu Group, publisher of both newspapers
The Hindu Literary Prize, a literary award
 Hindus, adherents of Hindu religion or culture
The Hindus: An Alternative History, a 2009 work of historiography

See also
 Hindu (disambiguation)
 Hinduism, a major religion
 Hindoo (disambiguation)